Alajos Drávecz (29 November 1866 – 28 August 1915) was a Slovenian ethnologist and writer.

Born in Rábatótfalu (now Szentgotthárd). His parents were István Drávecz and Rozália Korpics. The young Drávecz and his wife emigrated to the USA, then came back to Hungary, and settled down in Rábakethely (now Szentgotthárd).
In 1915 Drávecz joined the forces and call out in North-Hungary (Slovakia), later in Moravia. He was killed in Lipník nad Bečvou, near Olomouc.

Drávecz  noted down the Slovene popular costume in the Luca day, and the Andrew day, and folk songs.

His work
 Národna vera i navade v vési

See also
 List of Slovene writers and poets in Hungary
 Hungarian Slovenes

References
 Francek Mukič - Marija Kozar: Slovensko Porabje, Mohorjeva družba, Celje 1982.

1866 births
1915 deaths
People from Szentgotthárd
Slovenian writers and poets in Hungary
Slovenian ethnologists
Austro-Hungarian military personnel killed in World War I